David James Mack III (born December 13, 1953) is an American politician. He is a former member of the South Carolina House of Representatives from the 103rd District, serving from 1997 to 2020. He is a member of the Democratic party.

References

External links

Living people
1953 births
Democratic Party members of the South Carolina House of Representatives
African-American state legislators in South Carolina
21st-century American politicians
21st-century African-American politicians
20th-century African-American people